The RAF Centre of Aviation Medicine (RAF CAM) is a medical organisation run by the Royal Air Force and based at RAF Henlow in Bedfordshire. It is the main organisation conducting aviation medicine research in the UK.

History

Formation
The centre was formed on 1 December 1998 as a result of the merger of the School of Aviation Medicine based at Farnborough in Hampshire and the Aviation Medicine Training Centre based at RAF North Luffenham in Rutland.

The centre's predecessor was the RAF Institute of Aviation Medicine (RAF IAM), which closed in 1994.

Expansion
The RAF Medical Board and RAF Institute of Health moved from RAF Halton in Buckinghamshire to the centre on 1 June 2000, becoming the Occupation and Environmental Medicine Wing.

It was formerly part of RAF Personnel and Training Command, becoming part of RAF Air Command in 2007.

In April 2022, the centre retired its two BAE Systems Hawk T1 which were based at MOD Boscombe Down in Wiltshire. The aircraft were used for trials by the centre's Aviation Medicine Flight. The flight moved to RAF Waddington to continue its work using Hawks operated by the Red Arrows.

Future 
Due to anticipated closure of RAF Henlow, It is planned to relocate the centre to a new purpose-built facility at RAF Cranwell by 2026.

Function
The RAF Centre of Aviation Medicine is the lead authority in the British Armed Forces for aviation medicine and provides:

 advice, support and services to the Ministry of Defence, British Army, Royal Navy and Royal Air Force, Military Aviation Authority, Air Accidents Investigation Branch, Defence Accident Investigation Branch, academia and commercial organisations
 support in the development of aircraft and other systems, including urgent operational requirements
 the RAF Medical Board and clinical assessment of military aircrew and air traffic controllers
 chemical, biological, radiological and nuclear (CBRN) training for aircrew
 aviation medicine training to the British armed forces and aircrew and medical personnel from other nations
 aviation medicine & aeromedical policy
 occupational health and environmental health support

Flying research 
The centre researches the medical effects of flying, such as hypoxia and the effects of G-force. Flying fast-jet aircraft puts the cardiovascular physiology of the human body under extreme physical stress. Without intervention, exposure to high G force would cause a pilot to lose consciousness through lack of blood to the brain, otherwise known as G-induced loss of consciousness or G-LOC. Eurofighter Typhoon pilots regularly experience 9G. Other dangers include rapid uncontrolled decompression from failure of cabin pressurisation, and the centre has four hypobaric chambers.

Airlines that do not have their own aviation medicine research establishments (e.g. British Airways) have contracted out work to the RAF's Centre.

Academic support
King's College London School of Medicine and Dentistry at Guy's Hospital has run a MSc programme in aviation medicine, which involves the RAF's Centre, specifically the practical experience of G-forces, decompression, whole-body vibration, and vestibular (balance sensory system) and visual disorientation.

Training courses
The centre provides training for aircrew from the RAF and other organisations (via International Defence Training or Horizon Training) in subjects such as using night vision goggles and dealing with hypoxia.

It provides training for the on-board Critical Care Air Support Team (CCAST, similar to the Critical Care Air Transport Team of the USAF)

Facilities
The new RAF High G Training and Test Facility at RAF College Cranwell was opened on 4 February 2019 and is used to provide high-G training.

See also
 Diving Diseases Research Centre, in Plymouth
 Luftwaffe Institute of Aviation Medicine
 USAF School of Aerospace Medicine (USAFSAM) at Wright-Patterson Air Force Base, Ohio
 Netherlands Aeromedical Institute at Soesterberg Air Base
 Aerospace Medical Association

References

External links
 Online catalogue
 Aviation photography showing the two Hawk aircraft
 Medical training support website
 Bear Grylls learns about hypoxia during parachute training in 2005

News items
 BBC's Inside Out visits the hypobaric chamber to test the effects of hypoxia
 Price Edward tours the centre in October 2006
 BBC Breakfast RAF pilots get new G-force training centre

Aviation medicine organizations
Aviation research institutes
Health in Bedfordshire
Organisations based in Bedfordshire
Organizations established in 1998
Royal Air Force Medical Services
Medical associations based in the United Kingdom
Medical research institutes in the United Kingdom
Military medical training establishments
Military research establishments of the United Kingdom
Science and technology in Bedfordshire
Training establishments of the Royal Air Force
Aviation organisations based in the United Kingdom
Military medical research organizations of the United Kingdom
Henlow